Midwestern Saturday Night is the self-published debut album by American singer-songwriter Susan Werner, released in 1993 (see 1993 in music).

Track listing
All songs written by Susan Werner, except where noted

"So Heavy" – 3:35
"Born a Little Late (The Baby Boomer Song)" – 2:55
"Midwestern Saturday Night" – 5:21
"I Still Believe" – 5:21
"Rubber Glove Blues" – 2:44
"Lullabye for One" – 4:09
"Uncle John" – 2:32
"The Great Out There" (Greg Simon) – 3:42
"Maybe If I Played Cole Porter" – 4:37
"Shadow Dancing" – 4:01

Personnel
Susan Werner – guitar, piano, keyboard, vocals, background vocals
Paul Gehman – upright and electric bass
Lou Abbott – percussion
Julia Haines – Celtic harp
Erik Johnson – drums

Production
Producer: Grant MacAvoy
Engineer: Glenn Barratt
Arrangers: Lou Abbott, Susan Werner

Susan Werner albums
1993 debut albums